The 2003 Formula BMW ADAC season was a multi-event motor racing championship for open wheel, formula racing cars held across Europe. The championship featured drivers competing in 1.2 litre Formula BMW single seat race cars. The 2003 season was the sixth Formula BMW ADAC season organized by BMW Motorsport and ADAC.  The season began at Hockenheimring on 26 April and finished at the same place on 5 October, after twenty races.

Maximilian Götz was crowned series champion.
Götz beat future Formula One World Champion Sebastian Vettel to the championship by 43 points, winning six races.

Driver lineup

2003 Schedule
The series supported the Deutsche Tourenwagen Masters at nine rounds, with additional round at the European Grand Prix on 28–29 June.

Season standings

Drivers Standings
Points are awarded as follows:

References

External links
 Formula BMW ADAC 2003 on adac-motorsport.de
 2003 Formula BMW ADAC statistics on Driver Database

Formula BMW seasons
Formula BMW ADAC
Formula BMW ADAC
BMW ADAC